Donald E. McQuinn (born 1930 in Winthrop, Massachusetts) is an American best-selling author, and former U.S. Marine.

McQuinn graduated from high school in Texas, and attended the University of Washington on a Navy scholarship.  He served 20 years in the Marines, retiring in 1971 as a major, before becoming an author.

In September 1998 he suffered a sudden cardiac arrest while on vacation in Hawaii and became the first person saved by the police department's recent deployment of automated external defibrillators.

A third book in the Captain Lannat series was announced by the publisher as "a work in progress", but remains unfinished or unpublished.

Bibliography
 Targets (set during the Vietnam War), 1980, 
 Wake in Darkness (set in the Philippines), 1981, 
 Shadow of Lies (contemporary spy novel), July 1985, 
 Moondark Saga post-apocalyptic trilogy (published in nine parts in Germany)
 Warrior (November 1990), 
 Wanderer (November 1993), 
 Witch (November 1994), 
 Captain Lannat science fiction series
 With Full Honors (November 1996), 
 The Prisoner Within (December 1997),

Notes

References

External links

 
 Del Rey sample chapters:
 Witch – Chapter One
 With Full Honors – Chapter One
 The Prisoner Within – Chapter One

1930 births
Novelists from Massachusetts
People from Winthrop, Massachusetts
Novelists from Texas
People from King County, Washington
University of Washington alumni
United States Marines
20th-century American novelists
American male novelists
Living people
20th-century American male writers